Spanish singer-songwriter Belinda Peregrín has released four studio albums, four EPs, five soundtracks, twenty-three singles, two DVDs, and twenty-two music videos. Billboard mentioned her as "The Latin Pop Princess". As of 2006, Belinda was listed as the third best-selling female Mexican artist in the United States, together, her four studio albums and soundtracks with over two million records sold, behind only Thalía and Paulina Rubio. Together, her four studio albums have sold over two million copies worldwide.

Albums

Studio albums

Compilation albums

Soundtracks

EPs

Singles

As lead artist

Promotional singles

As featured artist

DVDs

Videography

Music videos

Other music videos

Guest music videos

Promotional videos

Cameo appearances

See also
 List of songs recorded by Belinda

References 

Discography
Discographies of Mexican artists
Discographies of Spanish artists
Latin pop music discographies